Desensitized may refer to:

 Desensitized (Pitchshifter album), 1993
 Desensitized (Drowning Pool album), 2004
 "Desensitized", a song by Green Day from Shenanigans
 "Desensitized", a song by The Mighty Mighty Bosstones from Let's Face It
 Desensitized, an album by Darker Half, 2011

See also 
 Desensitization (disambiguation)